Cristian David Berdeja Villavicencio (born June 21, 1981 in Coyuca de Benítez, Guerrero) is a male walker from Mexico. He was Junior World Champion, Junior Panamerican Champion and Junior Central American Champion. PanAmerican Champion 50 km San Salvador 2009 and Medellín 2011.

Personal bests

International competitions

1: Competing out of competition.

References

External links
 

1981 births
Living people
Sportspeople from Guerrero
Mexican male racewalkers
Pan American Games competitors for Mexico
Athletes (track and field) at the 2007 Pan American Games
World Athletics Championships athletes for Mexico
Central American and Caribbean Games bronze medalists for Mexico
Competitors at the 2010 Central American and Caribbean Games
Competitors at the 2014 Central American and Caribbean Games
Central American and Caribbean Games medalists in athletics
Competitors at the 2001 Summer Universiade
Competitors at the 2003 Summer Universiade
21st-century Mexican people